The women's 4 × 100 metres relay at the 2019 World Athletics Championships was held at the Khalifa International Stadium in Doha, Qatar, from 4 to 5 October 2019.

Summary

Already the world leader from their qualifying heat, Jamaica added a fresh Shericka Jackson to anchor. The British team brought in their star Dina Asher-Smith to run the second leg (completing an Asha, Asher-Smith, Ashleigh alliterative combination). Uncharacteristically, USA ran the same four runners.

On the first leg of the final, Natalliah Whyte got Jamaica into the lead passing to their star Shelly-Ann Fraser-Pryce first. Against Asher-Smith, two lanes to her outside and USA's Teahna Daniels three lanes out, Fraser-Pryce appeared to gain slightly against the stagger. Already passed one lane outside of Jamaica, Trinidad and Tobago's Kelly-Ann Baptiste was left far behind, more indicative of the damage Fraser-Pryce inflicted on the competition. She handed off efficiently to Jonielle Smith. Through the turn, Jamaica had the lead, USA's Morolake Akinosun and GBR's Ashleigh Nelson battling for second with Mujinga Kambundji bringing the Swiss team into contention, chased by China. Jamaica's pass to Jackson had a slight hesitation but they left the zone with a 3 metre lead. GBR entered the final zone side by side with USA. GBR's stick, passing to Daryll Neita, never stopped moving. Comparatively, USA ran up onto Kiara Parker. In all GBR gained a metre and a half coming out of the zone with Switzerland's pass to Salomé Kora keeping pace. Jackson held Jamaica's lead across the finish line with Neita running a strong leg to keep the pressure on. Parker was unable to make any gain, but USA held off a fast closing Switzerland for bronze.

China's final pass from Kong Lingwei to Ge Manqi was disastrous. While being competitive for a bronze medal in the World Championships, they were unable to complete the pass within the 30 metre zone. Two metres after the zone, Ge stopped with both athletes holding the baton. Ge released it and both athletes ran back into the zone, hesitated in the middle for a moment, then on to just outside the beginning of the (previous rules) zone. Kong then tried to step forward to pass the baton, but she passed Ge standing in a statuesque position to receive the baton. Ge refused to take it. Kong then stepped behind Ge, handed her the baton and Ge took off running some 20 seconds after Jackson had crossed the finish line. Because the baton pass did not adhere to the rules, China was disqualified.

Jamaica's winning time 41.44 was the eighth fastest women's 4x100 of all time. 4 of the 7 faster races also were Jamaican teams with Shelly-Ann Fraser-Pryce as a member.

Records
Before the competition records were as follows:

The following records were set at the competition:

Schedule
The event schedule, in local time (UTC+3), was as follows:

Results

Heats
The first three in each heat (Q) and the next two fastest (q) qualified for the final.

Final
The final was started on 5 October at 22:05.

References

4 x 100 metres relay
Relays at the World Athletics Championships